CJTR-FM is a Canadian radio station, airing at 91.3 FM in Regina, Saskatchewan. The station airs a community radio format, featuring a variety of musical styles and talk shows.  It is operated by Radius Communications, a non-profit corporation that began fundraising in 1996 and got the station on the air in 2001.

This station is run primarily by volunteers, supported financially by some Regina-area sponsors and by fundraisers. It also, in part, serves as an unofficial campus radio station for the University of Regina, actively soliciting volunteer participation among the university's student body as the school does not have its own campus radio station.

Until CJTR signed on, Regina was the largest market in Canada without either a campus or community radio station. An attempt in 1995 to incorporate a campus radio station at the University of Regina was abandoned for financial reasons, and as a result of that project's failure, Radius Communications incorporated and continued to pursue a community radio license.

The CJTR music garage sale is a big source of money for the station - yearlong they collect donations of CDs, records, stereo equipment, music-related books, clothing, DVDs and more, and then sell them at great prices in one big sale.  Members also pay a yearly $25 CD fee, for which they receive a newsletter and sometimes discounts from sponsors.

Notes
CJTR was formerly the callsign of a now-defunct AM radio station in Trois-Rivières, Quebec.

External links
www.cjtr.ca - CJTR
 
Decision CRTC 2001-47

Jtr
Jtr
Radio stations established in 2001
2001 establishments in Saskatchewan